Obtegomeria is a genus of flowering plant in the family Lamiaceae, first described in 1998. It contains only one known species, Obtegomeria caerulescens, endemic to the Sierra Nevada de Santa Marta in northern Colombia.

References

External links
photo of type specimen at Field Museum in Chicago

Lamiaceae
Endemic flora of Colombia
Monotypic Lamiaceae genera